121st Brigade may refer to:
121st Brigade a 'bantam' infantry formation of the British Army 1915–18
121st Infantry Brigade a deception formation of the British Army in Sicily 1943–44
CXXI Brigade Royal Artillery a British Army unit 1915–16
121st Artillery Brigade of the former Soviet Ground Forces
121st Brigade of the Chinese Republican army 1932
121st Field Artillery Brigade of the Egyptian Army
121st (Independent) Infantry Brigade of the Indian Army
121st Tank Brigade of the Red Army 1942
121st High-Power Howitzer Artillery Brigade of the Red Army 1945